The Liga Premier is the third tier of football in Mexico within the Mexican football league system that governs Serie A and Serie B leagues/group competitions. They compete from the fall to spring each season, promotion and relegation between each group, and promotion to Liga de Expansión MX and relegation to Liga TDP within the league system.

History 
The 1993–94 season Segunda  División champion was the last to be promoted to the Primera División. In 1994–95 season, the Mexican Football Federation created the "Primera División A" (renamed Ascenso MX in 2012) with 15 teams from the Segunda División, and all other teams remained in the league that continued to be called 'Segunda División' (Second Division) but at the new third tier of the Mexican football league system.

Each season has Segunda División teams divided into geographic zones with matches predominantly among the teams of that group. Each season had two tournaments: Apertura (opening) and Clausura (closing) tournament with one team each year being promoted to Primera División A.

In 2008, the Mexican Football Federation, with the approval of the chairmen of the clubs in the Second and Third tiers, change the format of the league dividing the number of teams into two divisions, the Liga Premier de Ascenso (Promotional Premier League) and the Liga de Nuevos Talentos (League of New Talents). Each of the new leagues was divided into geographic groups. The winning club could earn promotion to Primera División A, renamed Liga de Ascenso in 2009, provided their stadium and financial stability met the licensing requirements of Liga de Ascenso. From 2011 and 2016, no teams were relegated to Liga Premier, although Pumas Morelos was to be relegated in 2013 but they dissolved before they could play in the lower league. Promotion still occurred during these years provided the club was licensed to participate. In June 2016, Ascenso MX announced they would resume relegating teams.

Rebranding 

In June 2017, Segunda División announced a rebranding of the league. Instead of being referred to as the Second Division they would be called Liga Premier (Premier League). The league would continue to have two divisions, however these new divisions would be called Serie A de México and Serie B de México. Serie A which would have independent teams as well as the affiliate teams of the higher level leagues in Mexico, Liga MX and Ascenso MX, while Serie B would only have independent teams.

Promotion and relegation would be formalized between the leagues. Serie A would promote one club to Ascenso MX and would accept one club relegated from Ascenco MX each year. Additionally, one Serie B club could promote to Serie A and one club would be relegated from Serie A each year. Finally, two Serie B clubs would be relegated each year to Tercera División de México ("Liga TDP"), and two clubs would be promoted from Liga TDP provided they meet the Serie requirements of Article 57.

Current structure 

Serie A de México league has 33 teams (1 Liga MX Reserve Team, 5 Liga de Expansión MX Reserve Teams and 27 Serie A Teams) divided into three geographical groups. The top 4 teams from each group at end of the season will play for promotion to Liga de Expansión MX provided that the club meets the requirements for the stadium and financial stability.

Serie B de México has 11 teams (3 Liga de Expansión MX Reserve Teams and 8 Serie B Teams).

Serie A clubs
Below are listed the  member clubs of the Serie A for the 2022-23 season.

Serie B clubs
Below are listed the  member clubs of the Serie B for the 2022-23 season.

Champions

References

External links
 Liga Premier website 
 Magazine page 
 league information 

 
3
Mex
Professional sports leagues in Mexico